Akdemir is both a Turkish surname and a masculine Turkish given name. Notable people with the name include:

Surname:
 Ali Akdemir, Turkish academic
 Diren Akdemir, Swiss-Turkish footballer

Given name:

Places
 Akdemir, Baskil

Turkish-language surnames
Turkish masculine given names